Twenties may refer to:

20s
1920s
2020s
 being in your twenties, the third decade of life, see young adult.
Twenties (TV series), an American comedy series broadcast from 2020